Kompleksi Vëllezërit Duli is a multi-use stadium in Koplik, Albania. The stadium has a capacity of 2,000 people and it is mostly used for football matches and it is the home ground of KS Veleçiku Koplik.

References

Football venues in Albania
Multi-purpose stadiums
Buildings and structures in Malësi e Madhe